Melhania velutina is a plant in the family Malvaceae, native to Africa and the Arabian Peninsula.

Description
The flowers have yellow petals.

Distribution and habitat
Melhania velutina is native to an area from Angola northeast to Sudan and east to Somalia. It is also native to Saudi Arabia and Yemen.

References

velutina
Flora of Northeast Tropical Africa
Flora of East Tropical Africa
Flora of West-Central Tropical Africa
Flora of Angola
Flora of Malawi
Flora of Saudi Arabia
Flora of Yemen
Plants described in 1775
Taxa named by Peter Forsskål